Lord Morris is the name of:

Lord Morris of Aberavon
Lord Morris of Manchester
Lord Morris of Handsworth
Lord Morris of Castle Morris
Baron Morris, various titles
Bill Morris, Baron Morris of Handsworth (born 1938), former British trade union leader
Brian Morris, Baron Morris of Castle Morris (1930–2001), British poet, critic and professor of literature, and politician
Charles Morris, Baron Morris of Grasmere (1898–1990)
Edward Morris, 1st Baron Morris (1859–1935)
John Morris, Baron Morris of Borth-y-Gest (1930-2001), English judge
John Morris, Baron Morris of Aberavon (born 1931), British retired politician
Michael Morris, 2nd Baron Morris
Michael Morris, 3rd Baron Morris
Harry Morris, 1st Baron Morris of Kenwood (1893–1954), British politician
Michael Morris, Baron Morris, also 1st Baron Killanin (1826–1901), Lord Chief Justice of the King's Bench for Ireland and Lord of Appeal in Ordinary 
Martin Morris, 2nd Baron Killanin (1867–1927)
Michael Morris, 3rd Baron Killanin (1914–1999)
Redmond Morris, 4th Baron Killanin (born 1947)
William Morris, 1st Viscount Nuffield (1877–1963), English motor manufacturer and philanthropist, founder of Morris Motors Limited